Steve Alton Burgess (July 9, 1907 – May 28, 1987) was a Texas politician that served in the Texas House of Representatives for district 4, 5, and 6.

Personal life
Steve Alton Burgess was born on July 9, 1907 in Nacogdoches, Texas to Timothy Eugene Burgess and Mary Bell Lackey. He was a life long resident of Nacogdoches County, Texas, and was a rancher and dairyman. He had 2 children Raymond and Rochelle. He was member of First United Methodist Church. Burgess died on May 28, 1987 in Nacogdoches, Texas.

Political career
Burgess served in the Texas House of Representatives for districts 6, 5, and 4. He later served as county judge of Nacogdoches County, Texas. Burgess was affiliated with the Democratic Party.

References

Democratic Party members of the Texas House of Representatives
People from Nacogdoches, Texas
1907 births
1987 deaths
20th-century American politicians